Caulfeild Glacier is the northern of two glaciers flowing into Hugi Glacier west of Dodunekov Bluff, on the west coast of Graham Land.

History
Caulfeild Glacier was photographed by Hunting Aerosurveys Ltd in 1955–57 and mapped from these photos by the Falkland Islands Dependencies Survey. It was named by the UK Antarctic Place-Names Committee in 1959 for Vivian Caulfeild (1874–1958), English pioneer ski instructor, one of the greatest authorities on technique.

See also
 List of glaciers in the Antarctic
 Glaciology

References
 

Glaciers of Graham Coast